Ikhshid was the princely title of the Iranian rulers of Soghdia and the Ferghana Valley in Transoxiana during the pre-Islamic and early Islamic periods. The title is of Iranian origin; scholars have derived it variously from the Old Iranian root khshaeta, "shining, brilliant", or from khshāyathiya, "ruler, king" (which is also the origin of the title shah). 

The Ikhshids of Sogdia, with their capital at Samarkand, are well attested during and after the Muslim conquest of Transoxiana. The line survived into Abbasid times, although by then its seat was in Istikhan. Among the most notable and energetic of the Soghdian kings was Gurak, who in 710 overthrew his predecessor Tarkhun and for almost thirty years, through shifting alliances, managed to preserve a precarious autonomy between the expanding Umayyad Caliphate and the Türgesh khaganate. 

The Arab authors report that the title was also used by the ruler of the Principality of Farghana during the same period: Ibn al-Athir reports that it was the ikhshid of Ferghana who called upon the Chinese for aid against the Arabs, resulting in the Battle of Talas.

The title's prestige in Central Asia remained high as late as the 10th century, when it was adopted by the Turkic commander and ruler of Egypt Muhammad ibn Tughj, whose grandfather had come from Ferghana. After his title the short-lived Egyptian dynasty founded by Muhammad al-Ikhshid is known as the Ikhshidid dynasty.

References

Sources 
 
 
 

Sogdian words and phrases
Royal titles
History of Samarkand